The sport of football in the country of Mauritania is run by the Football Federation of the Islamic Republic of Mauritania. The association administers the national football team, as well as the Mauritanian Premier League. Football is the most popular sport in the country.

National team

Mauritania is traditionally one of the weakest teams in Africa. 2019 Africa Cup of Nations is the first time Mauritania  qualified for the African Cup of Nations.

Mauritanian football venues

References